Australian and New Zealand Standard Industrial Classification (ANZSIC) was jointly developed by the Australian Bureau of Statistics and Statistics New Zealand in order to make it easier to compare industry statistics between the two countries and with the rest of the world.

The 2006 edition of the ANZSIC replaced the 1993 edition, which was the first version produced. Prior to 1993, Australia and New Zealand had separate industry classifications. It is arranged into 19 broad industry divisions and 96 industry subdivisions There are two more detailed levels called Groups and Classes. ANZSIC codes are four-digit numbers. The Australian Taxation Office (ATO) uses five-digit codes referred to as Business Industry Codes.

In the 2006 edition, Industry Division D has been expanded to include 'Waste Services', and  'hunting' is removed from Industry Division A.

Divisions and subdivisions

A — Agriculture, Forestry and Fishing 

 01 — Agriculture
 011 — Nursery and Floriculture Production
 012 — Mushroom and Vegetable Growing
 013 — Fruit Tree and Nut Growing
 014 — Sheep, Beef Cattle and Grain Farming
 015 — Other Crop Growing
 016 — Dairy Cattle Farming
 017 — Poultry Farming
 018 — Deer Farming
 019 — Other Livestock Farming
 02 — Aquaculture
03 — Forestry and Logging
04 — Fishing, Hunting and Trapping
041 — Fishing
042 — Hunting and Trapping
05 — Agriculture, Forestry and Fishing Support Services
051 — Forestry Support Services
052 — Agriculture and Fishing Support Services

B — Mining 

06 — Coal Mining
07 — Oil and Gas Extraction
08 — Metal Ore Mining
09 — Non-Metallic Mineral Mining and Quarrying
091 — Construction Material Mining
099 — Other Non-Metallic Mineral Mining and Quarrying
10 — Exploration and Other Mining Support Services
101 — Exploration
109 — Other Mining Support Services

C — Manufacturing 

11 — Food Product Manufacturing
111 — Meat and meat product manufacturing
112 — Seafood processing
113 — Dairy product manufacturing
114 — Fruit and vegetable processing
115 — Oil and fat manufacturing
116 — Grain mill and cereal product manufacturing
117 — Bakery product manufacturing
118 — Sugar and confectionary manufacturing
119 — Other food manufacturing
12 — Beverage and Tobacco Product Manufacturing
121 — Beverage manufacturing
122 — Cigarette and tobacco product manufacturing 
13 — Textile, Leather, Clothing and Footwear Manufacturing
131 — Textile manufacturing
132 — Leather tanning, fur dressing and leather product manufacturing
133 — Textile product manufacturing
134 — Knitted product manufacturing
135 — Clothing and footwear manufacturing
14 — Wood Product Manufacturing
141 — Log sawmilling and timber dressing
149 — Other wood product manufacturing
15 — Pulp, Paper and Converted Paper Product Manufacturing
151 — Pulp, paper and paperboard manufacturing
152 — Converted paper product manufacturing
16 — Printing (including the Reproduction of Recorded Media)
161 — Printing and printing support services
162 — Reproduction of recorded media
17 — Petroleum and Coal Product Manufacturing
18 — Basic Chemical and Chemical Product Manufacturing
181 — Basic chemical manufacturing
182 — Basic polymer manufacturing
183 — Fertiliser and pesticide manufacturing
184 — Pharmaceutical and medicinal product manufacturing
185 — Cleaning compound and toiletry preparation manufacturing
189 — Other basic chemical product manufacturing
19 — Polymer Product and Rubber Product Manufacturing
191 — Polymer product manufacturing
192 — Natural rubber product manufacturing
20 — Non-Metallic Mineral Product Manufacturing
201 — Glass and glass product manufacturing
202 — Ceramic product manufacturing
203 — Cement, lime, plaster and concrete product manufacturing
209 — Other non-metallic mineral product manufacturing
21 — Primary Metal and Metal Product Manufacturing
211 — Basic ferrous metal manufacturing
212 — Basic ferrous metal product manufacturing
213 — Basic non-ferrous metal manufacturing
214 — Basic non-ferrous metal product manufacturing
22 — Fabricated Metal Product Manufacturing
221 — Iron and steel forging
222 — Structural metal product manufacturing
223 — Metal container manufacturing
224 — Sheet metal product manufacturing (except metal structural and container products)
229  — Other fabricated metal product manufacturing
23 — Transport Equipment Manufacturing
231 — Motor vehicle and motor vehicle part manufacturing
239 — Other transport equipment manufacturing
24 — Machinery and Equipment Manufacturing
241 — Professional and scientific equipment manufacturing
242 — Computer and electronic equipment manufacturing
243 — Electrical equipment manufacturing
244 — Domestic appliance manufacturing
245 — Pump, compressor, heating and ventilation equipment manufacturing
246 — Specialised machinery and equipment manufacturing
249 — Other machinery and equipment manufacturing
25 — Furniture and Other Manufacturing
251 — Furniture manufacturing
259 — Other manufacturing

D — Electricity, Gas, Water and Waste Services 

26 — Electricity Supply
261 — Electricity generation
262 — Electricity transmission
263 — Electricity distribution
264 — On selling electricity and electricity market operation
27 — Gas Supply
28 — Water Supply, Sewerage and Drainage Services
29 — Waste Collection, Treatment and Disposal Services
291 — Waste collection services
292 — Waste treatment, disposal and remediation services

E — Construction 

30 — Building Construction
301 — Residential Building Construction 
302 — Non-Residential Building Construction
31 — Heavy and Civil Engineering Construction
32 — Construction Services
321 — Land Development and Site Preparation Services
322 — Building Structure Services
323 — Building Installation Services
324 — Building Completion Services
329 — Other Construction Services

F — Wholesale Trade 

 33 — Basic Material Wholesaling
331 — Agricultural product wholesaling
332 — Mineral, metal and chemical wholesaling
333 — Timber and hardware goods wholesaling
 34 — Machinery and Equipment Wholesaling
341 — Specialiased industrial machinery and equipment manufacturing
349 — Other machinery and equipment wholesaling
 35 — Motor Vehicle and Motor Vehicle Parts Wholesaling
 36 — Grocery, Liquor and Tobacco Product Wholesaling
 37 — Other Goods Wholesaling
371 — Textile, clothing and footwear wholesaling
372 — Pharmaceutical and toiletry good manufacturing
373 — Furniture, floor covering and other goods wholesaling
 38 — Commission-Based Wholesaling

G — Retail Trade 

39 — Motor vehicle and motor vehicle parts retailing
391 — Motor vehicle retailing
392 — Motor vehicle parts and tyre retailing
40 — Fuel retailing
41 — Food retailing
411 — Supermarkets and grocery stores
412 — Specialised food retailing
42 — Other store-based retailing
421 — Furniture, floor coverings, houseware and textile goods retailing
422 — Electrical and electronic goods retailing
423 — Hardware, building and garden supplies retailing
424 — Recreational goods retailing
425 — Clothing, footwear and personal accessory retailing
426 — Department stores
427 — Pharmaceutical and other store-based retailing
43 — Non-store retailing and retail commission-based buying and/or selling
431 — Non-store retailing
432 — Retail commission-based buying and/or selling

H — Accommodation and Food Services 

44 — Accommodation
45 — Food and beverage services
451 — Cafes, restaurants and takeaway food services
452 — Pubs, taverns and bars
453 — Clubs (hospitality)

I — Transport, Postal and Warehousing 

46 — Road Transport
461 — Road freight transport
462 — Road passenger transport
47 — Rail Transport
461 — Rail freight transport
462 — Rail passenger transport
48 — Water Transport
481 — Water freight transport
482 — Water passenger transport
49 — Air and Space Transport
50 — Other Transport
501 — Scenic and sightseeing transport
502 — Pipeline and other transport
51 — Postal and Courier Pick-up and Delivery Services
52 — Transport Support Services
521 — Water transport support services
522 — Airport operations and other air transport services
523 — Other transport support services
53 — Warehousing and Storage Services

J — Information Media and Telecommunications 

54 — Publishing (except Internet and Music Publishing)
541 — Newspaper, periodical, book and directory publishing
542 — Software publishing
55 — Motion Picture and Sound Recording Activities
551 — Motion picture and video activities
552 — Sound recording and music publishing
56 — Broadcasting (except Internet)
561 — Radio broadcasting
562 — Television broadcasting
57 — Internet Publishing and Broadcasting
58 — Telecommunications Services
59 — Internet Service Providers, Web Search Portals and Data Processing Services
591 — Internet service providers and web search portals
592 — Data processing, web hosting and electronic information storage services
60 — Library and Other Information Services
601 — Libraries and archives
602 — Other information services

K — Financial and Insurance Services 

62 — Finance
621 — Central banking
622 — Depository financial intermediation
623 — Non-depository financing
624 — Financial asset investing
63 — Insurance and Superannuation Funds
631 — Life insurance
632 — Health and general insurance
633 — Superannuation funds
64 — Auxiliary Finance and Insurance Services

L — Rental, Hiring and Real Estate Services 

66 — Rental and Hiring Services (except Real Estate)
661 — Motor vehicle and transport equipment rental and hiring
662 — Farm animal and bloodstock leasing
663 — Other goods and equipment rental and hiring
664 — Non-financial intangible assets (except copyrights) leasing
67 — Property Operators and Real Estate Services
671 — Property operators
672 — Real estate services

M — Professional, Scientific and Technical Services 

69 — Professional, Scientific and Technical Services (Except Computer System Design and Related Services)
691 — Scientific research services
692 — Architectural, engineering and technical services
693 — Legal and accounting services
694 — Advertising services
695 — Market research and statistical services
696 — Management and related consulting services
697 — Veterinary services
699 — Other professional, scientific and technical services
70 — Computer System Design and Related Services

N — Administrative and Support Services 

72 — Administrative Services
721 — Employment services
722 — Travel agency and tour arrangement services
729 — Other administrative services
73 — Building Cleaning, Pest Control and Other Support Services
731 — Building cleaning, pest control and gardening services
732 — Packaging services

O — Public Administration and Safety 

75 — Public Administration
751 — Central government administration
752 — State government administration
753 — Local government administration
754 — Justice
755 — Government representation
76 — Defence
77 — Public Order, Safety and Regulatory Services
771 — Public order and safety services
772 — Regulatory services

P — Education and Training 

80 — Preschool and School Education
801 — Preschool education
802 — School education
81 — Tertiary Education
82 — Adult, Community and Other Education
821 — Adult, community and other education
822 — Education support services

Q — Health Care and Social Assistance 

84 — Hospitals
85 — Medical and Other Health Care Services
851 — Medical services
852 — Pathology and diagnostic imaging services
853 — Allied health services
859 — Other health care services
86 — Residential Care Services
87 — Social Assistance Services
871 — Child care services
879 — Other social assistance services

R — Arts and Recreation Services 

89 — Heritage Activities
891 — Museum operation
892 — Parks and gardens operation
90 — Creative and Performing Arts Activities
91 — Sports and Recreation Activities
911 — Sports and physical recreation activities
912 — Horse and dog racing activities
913 — Amusement and other recreation activities 
92 — Gambling Activities

S — Other Services 

94 — Repair and Maintenance
941 — Automotive repair and maintenance
942 — Machinery and equipment repair and maintenance
949 — Other repairs and maintenance
95 — Personal and Other Services
951 — Personal care services
952 — Funeral, crematorium and cemetery services
953 — Other personal services
954 — Religious services
955 — Civic, professional and other interest group services
96 — Private Households Employing Staff and Undifferentiated Goods- and Service-Producing Activities of Households for Own Use

References
 The list of codes from the ABS
Business industry code search list, ATO
Business Industry Classification Code Search, New Zealand
 1292.0 - Australian and New Zealand Standard Industrial Classification (ANZSIC), 2006 (Revision 1.0), ABS
 1292.0 - Australian and New Zealand Standard Industrial Classification (ANZSIC), 1993, ABS
 Industrial classification, Statistics New Zealand 2006 Buy Barstools NZ

Industry in Australia
Industry in New Zealand
Industry classifications
Standards of Australia and New Zealand
Taxation in Australia